Abaco is a variant Italian form of the Biblical name "Habakkuk" (but normally Abacùc or Abacucco).

Abaco may refer to:

People
Evaristo Felice Dall'Abaco (1675–1742), Italian composer and violinist
Joseph Abaco (1710–1805), Belgian composer and violoncellist

Places
Abaco Islands, part of the northern Bahamas
North Abaco
Central Abaco
South Abaco
Abaco National Park

Other uses
Abaco (web browser), the web browser
Abaco Air, Bahamian airline
Abaco Independence Movement, separatist organization on the Abaco islands

See also
 Abacus (disambiguation)